The Chariton Herald-Patriot Building is located in Chariton, Iowa, United States. This is the earliest known building designed by Local architect William L. Perkins, who had arrived in town the year before the building was completed in 1918.  The two-story hydro-stone block structure features a three bay, symmetrical facade, a simple classical cornice, and simple pilasters on the first floor with plain capitals that divide the bays.  The significance of the hydro-stone, which is a type of concrete block, is its use as a then new building material.  The building was individually listed on the National Register of Historic Places in 2006.  In 2014 it was included as a contributing property in the Lucas County Courthouse Square Historic District.

References

Commercial buildings completed in 1918
Chariton, Iowa
Neoclassical architecture in Iowa
Buildings and structures in Lucas County, Iowa
National Register of Historic Places in Lucas County, Iowa
Commercial buildings on the National Register of Historic Places in Iowa
Individually listed contributing properties to historic districts on the National Register in Iowa